Pawnshop  is an adventure and crime film directed by Liubomyr Levytskyi. The premiere took place in Ukraine on 19 September 2013.

Plot 
The scene takes place in the present in the abstract city of Lemberg. The picture consists of three storylines that are cleverly intertwined. The main characters — two Lembergian guys, Mark and Yasha (Denys Nikiforov and Pavlo Piskun), know the street and know how to get everything you need for life. Mark called a noble bandit, and Yasha, on the contrary, everything is decided with the help of intelligence. Passing difficult twists and turns in his youth, the brothers begin to look for stability. It was one of those days they get the news of the inheritance. Them is known in a pawn shop and its owner at the moment is their uncle Felix. Arriving at the pawn shop for their guys receive a sharp rebuff. Mark and Yasha decide: any way to get the inheritance. Their opinions differ, and each comes up with his plan.

Cast 
 Denys Nikiforov as Mark Levin
 Pavlo Piskun as Yasha Levine
 Denys Dadaiev as "Aspirin"
 Valeriy Lehin as Uncle Felix
 Andriy Burym as a collector
 Olha Storozhuk as Rita
 Vasylisa Frolova as a jeweler
 Ihor Hniezdilov
 Serhiy Romaniuk as policeman
 Kostiantyn Koretskyi as Bob
 Serhiy Stakhov as Hopnyk
 Anatoliy Zinovenko
 Maksym Pankov as Michael, collector
 Volodymyr Beliaiev as crime boss
 Anatoliy Pryimak as bandit from brigade Mark
 Serhiy Shliahtych as policeman
 Olena Musiyenko
 Vitaliy Anisimov
 Alina Zavalska (only in the Director's version)

References 

2013 films
Ukrainian crime films
Ukrainian-language films
Ukrainian adventure films